The Zimbabwe A cricket team toured Bangladesh from 14 September to 1 October 2014. The tour consisted of two Unofficial Test matches and three unofficial ODIs matches. This tour was organised in June–July 2014 after Bangladesh postponed due to monsoon season and was rescheduled in September–October 2014.

Squads

Unofficial Test series

1st Unofficial Test

2nd Unofficial Test

Unofficial ODIs series

1st unofficial ODI

2nd unofficial ODI

3rd unofficial ODI

See also

References

External links 
 Zimbabwe A tour of Bangladesh 2014
 Zimbabwe A tour of Bangladesh 2014/15

2014 in Bangladeshi cricket
2014 in Zimbabwean cricket
International cricket competitions in 2014–15